A tourist is a person travelling for recreational, medical, leisure or business purposes.

Tourist may also refer to:

Arts, entertainment and media

Films
 The Tourist (1912 film), a silent comedy directed by Mack Sennett
 The Tourist (1921 film), a silent comedy starring Oliver Hardy
 The Tourist (1925 film), a silent comedy directed by Roscoe Arbuckle
 The Tourist (1987 film), an Australian TV film
 The Tourist (2006 film), a German-Canadian short film by Eisha Marjara
 The Tourist (2008 film) (working title) or Deception, a thriller starring Ewan McGregor, Hugh Jackman and Michelle Williams
 The Tourist (2010 film), a romantic thriller starring Johnny Depp and Angelina Jolie
 The Tourist (2016 film), an independent drama starring Brett Dalton and Stana Katic
 Tourist (film), a 2021 Russian action film

Television
 The Tourist (TV series), a mystery thriller internationally co-produced television series
 "The Tourist" (Wander Over Yonder), a animated television episode

Literature
 The Tourist (comics), a 2006 graphic novel by Brian Wood
 The Tourist (novel), a 2009 espionage novel by Olen Steinhauer

Music
 Tourist (musician), an English electronic musician

Groups
 The Tourists, a 1970s British power pop band
 The Tourists (American band), a punk rock group that would become the alternative rock band Redd Kross

Albums
 Tourist (Athlete album), 2005
 Tourist (Saint Germain album), 2000
 The Tourist (album), a 1998 album by Mark Mallman
 The Tourist (Clap Your Hands Say Yeah album) (2017)
 The Tourists (album), a 1979 album by the eponymous band

Songs
 "Tourist" (song), the title song of The Tourists' 1979 album
 "Tourist", by Juliana Hatfield from In Exile Deo
 "The Tourist", by Radiohead from OK Computer
 "The Tourist", by Gerry Rafferty from Night Owl (album)

People
 Tourist (musician), the stage name of musician William Phillips (born 1987)
 Gennady Korotkevich (born 1994), Belarusian sport programmer who competes under the handle of "tourist"

Other uses
 Tourist (horse), a racehorse
 The Tourist (train), a former train on the Isle of Wight, UK
 "Tourist guy", a hoax photograph internet meme

See also
 The Touryst, 2019 video game
 Tourism (disambiguation)
 Touring (disambiguation)